Nicholas Savich Bakulin (29 March 1896–10 April 1962) was a Russian painter and illustrator.

Bakulin graduated from Moscow Technical High School in 1913, then in 1914-1915 he studied at the Moscow School of Painting, Sculpture and Architecture. He painted portraits and narrative compositions dedicated to the White Movement during the Russian Civil War.

Bakulin also painted for Russian magazines and restaurants in Prague.

References 

1896 births
1962 deaths
20th-century Russian painters
Russian male painters
People of World War I
20th-century Russian male artists
Moscow School of Painting, Sculpture and Architecture alumni